Waipahu High School is located at 94-1211 Farrington Highway in Waipahu on the island of Oahu in the state of Hawaii.  Waipahu High School was founded in 1938 under the Session Laws of 1937 and Act 191 of 1938.  The first graduates of Waipahu High School were from the class of 1941. The last graduating class from the "termite palace" was the class of 1969. Clarence B. Dyson became principal in 1942. Zachary Sheets became the new principal of the school in August 2022, after former principal Keith Hayashi was appointed as Hawaii Department of Education Superintendent in July 2022. Preceding Hayashi was long-time principal Patricia Pedersen, who retired in July 2009 following the graduation of the Class of 2009 of Waipahu High.

Waipahu High School offers Early College, which is a program that allows students to take college courses, from selected universities on the island, for free to further their education.

Traditions
 Arthur Awards:  To many, Arthur Award Competition is the high point of the year.  It promotes school unity and spirit among the students of Waipahu High School through interclass competition during Homecoming Week.  Arthur Competition consists of the Arthur Award Rally, Tug-of-War, Blue/Gold Day, and Alma Mater competition.
 Cane Knife:  This is a traditional football rivalry between Waipahu and James Campbell High School. Waipahu leads the series 40-10-1 as of January 2012.
 Career Day:  The primary purpose of Career Day is to introduce students to the many vocational opportunities available in the world today.  This is done through presentation, speakers and off-campus visits.  Career Day is scheduled at varying times during the school year..
 Senior Luau: This event is to kick off the soon-to-be graduates' year in high school. Exclusively for seniors, this gives the students a chance to party and have fun, usually occurring in early December. Traditionally, close friends or groups would wear the same pattern/fabric and make different kinds of clothing to signify unity and "aloha" among friends.
 May Fair:  The "Celebration of Life" has been held at Waipahu High since 1970 and is held on odd-numbered years.  This is a day of entertainment, assemblies, and trade fairs.  School recognized clubs are invited to open booths and most do.  Various school approved ethnic clubs participate in May Fair through cultural presentations, demonstrations, as well as kissing booths.  Items sold range from teri chicken plates to personalized name tags.
 New Year's Ball:  Scheduled during the winter season, this dance is open to all interested Waipahu High students.  It is non-floral, informal attire, originally intended to provide an economical social gathering.

Clubs
In November 2015, Waipahu High School's Slam Poetry Team, Verbal Ammunition, was rewarded with the Can You Kick It Award at the Ninth Annual Interscholastic Team Teen Poetry Slam, hosted by Pacific Tongues.

Sports
Waipahu High School fields teams in the following sports:

WHS competes in the OIA Western Division.  Waipahu also competes in HHSAA Division I competition, except for the sports without divisional affiliation.  [Those sports are air riflery, bowling, cross country, judo, paddling, tennis, track, golf, and wrestling.]

The 2003-2004 Junior Varsity Cheerleading squad were the OIA West JV Champions.

The 2004-2005 Varsity Football team was the OIA White Division Champion runner-up but later lost in the State Division II playoffs.

The 2004-2005 Varsity Cheerleading squad were the Aloha International Small Co-ed National Champions and holds the only athletic national title in its school's history.

The 2006-2007 Varsity Football team was the OIA White Division Champion but later lost in the State Division II playoffs to Kauai High School in the semifinals.

The 2007-2008 Boys Varsity Baseball team were the OIA West Division II regular season champions and later winning the OIA White Division Championship.

The 2008-2009 Boys Baseball team repeated as OIA West Division II regular season champions and OIA White Division Championship.

The 2005-2006 Boys Varsity Volleyball team won the first OIA White Division Championship in a sweep of Aiea.

The 2008-2009 Boys Varsity Volleyball team were OIA White West Champions and OIA White runner up.

The 2009-2010 Boys Varsity Baseball team were OIA White Division runner up.

The 2010-2011 Boys Varsity Soccer team were the OIA White Division Champions.

The 2011-2012 Girls Varsity Soccer team were the OIA White Division Champions.

The 2011-2012 Boys Varsity Baseball team were OIA White Champions and won their First State Division II Title in school's history completing a perfect season of 15-0.

The 2016-2017 Girls Varsity Soccer team were the OIA White Division Champions.

The 2017-2018 Boys Varsity Football team were the OIA White Division Champions.

The 2018 Boys Varsity Football team were OIA Red Champions and won their first State Division I Title in school's history.

The 2018-2019 Boys JV Soccer team were the OIA Division II Champions.

Notable alumni
Alphabetized by Surname (Graduation Year)

Greg "Da Bull" Noll (1955) - Former professional surfer
Zahn Marcello (1989) Former Football Player
Ben Apuna (1976) - professional athlete, National Football League, New York Giants (1980)
Brian M. Kanno (1979) - 1992-2006 Hawaii State Senator
Tina Machado (1977) - Miss Hawaii USA in 1985. Starred in episodes of Magnum, P.I. and is CEO of Arizona's Premiere App Development company, CodeRed-I. 
Herbert K. Pililaau (1948) - Medal of Honor recipient during the Korean War
Zoe Roach (1976) - Miss Hawaii at the 1979 Miss International pageant and Miss Hawaii USA in 1983
Alex Sonson (1978) - 2003-2006 Hawaii State Representative
Brian Viloria (1998) - 2005 WBC Light Flyweight Champion; 2009 IBF Junior Flyweight Champion (Boxing)
Falaniko Vitale (1992) - Former World MMA Middleweight Champion (Mixed martial arts)
Jeff Williams (1990) - Former professional baseball player (Los Angeles Dodgers)
Chester Desiderio (1995) - Purple Heart recipient during Operation Iraqi Freedom
Jerome Williams (1999) - 1st round MLB draft pick (SF Giants)

References

External links

Waipahu Class of '77 website
Waipahu Class of '64 website
Waipahu Class of '69 website
Waipahu High School Student Services

Educational institutions established in 1938
Public high schools in Honolulu County, Hawaii
1938 establishments in Hawaii
Waipahu, Hawaii